Fernando Molina (born 9 April 1938) is an Argentine long-distance runner. He competed in the marathon at the 1972 Summer Olympics.

References

1938 births
Living people
Athletes (track and field) at the 1972 Summer Olympics
Argentine male long-distance runners
Argentine male marathon runners
Olympic athletes of Argentina
Athletes (track and field) at the 1971 Pan American Games
Pan American Games competitors for Argentina
Place of birth missing (living people)
20th-century Argentine people